Rainer Sarnet (born March 3, 1969) is an Estonian film director whose work started in animation. He then worked in advertising and publishing. His works include November.

References

External links

Estonian film directors
1969 births
Estonian caricaturists
People from Rakvere
Estonian screenwriters
Estonian male writers
Living people
Tallinn University alumni